Notable people with the surname Arora include:

 Akanksha Arora (born 1986), Indo-Canadian auditor 
 Amrita Arora (born 1981), Indian actress
 Anjali Arora (born 1999), Social Media Fame
 Apoorva Arora, Indian actress and model 
 Arun Arora (born 1971), British Anglican priest
 Bobby Arora (born 1972), British billionaire businessman
 Chandan Arora, Indian film editor and director
 Damodar Das Arora, Punjabi poet
 David Arora (born 1953), American mycologist, naturalist, and writer
 Garima Arora (born 1986), Indian chef
 Jagjit Singh Arora (1916–2005), commander of the Indian army in the Eastern front in the Indo-Pakistani War of 1971
 Harjit Singh Arora (born 1961), the second-highest-ranking officer of the Indian Air Force 
 Jas Arora, model and actor
 Kush Arora, American music producer
 Malaika Arora, Indian model and actress
 Manish Arora, Indian fashion designer
 Monish Arora (born 1971), Indian-born Singaporean cricketer
 Nikesh Arora, chief business officer at Google
 Nira Arora, Canadian radio personality
 Paras Arora (born 1994), Indian actor
 Punita Arora, first woman Lieutenant General of Indian Armed Forces and Vice admiral of Indian Navy
 Rachita Arora, Indian singer and music composer
 Rajat Arora, Indian screenwriter in film and television industry.
 Ram Behari Arora, Indian cardiovascular pharmacologist 
 Robin Arora (born 1985), British billionaire businessman
 Saahil Arora, American esports player
 Sam Arora (born 1981), Maryland politician
 Samir Arora (born 1965), American businessperson
 Sanjeev Arora (born 1968), theoretical computer scientist
 Shalini Arora (born 1971), Indian television actress
 Simon Arora (born 1969), British billionaire businessman
 Sunil Arora (born 1953), Chief election commissioner of India
 Suresh Arora, Chief of Punjab Police (2014-2019)
 Surinder Arora, Punjabi English businessman
 Tarun Arora, Indian model and actor
 Trishneet Arora, Forbes Asia 30 under 30 (2018), Fortune India 40 under 40 (2019)
 Udai Prakash Arora (born 1944), Indian historian, pioneer in Graeco-Indian Studies
 Vijay Arora (1946–2007), Indian actor
 Vineet M. Arora, American medical researcher

See also 

 Arora, a community haling from Punjab.

References

Indian surnames
Hindu surnames
Punjabi-language surnames
Punjabi tribes